Kaleidoscope EP is the thirteenth extended play by British rock band Coldplay. It was released worldwide on 14 July 2017 and serves as a companion piece to Coldplay's seventh studio album, A Head Full of Dreams (2015). The EP was nominated for the Grammy Award for Best Pop Vocal Album at the 60th Annual Grammy Awards.

Background
On 21 November 2016, Chris Martin announced the EP title on the band's official Twitter account, it is the same as an interlude track from A Head Full of Dreams (2015). The release was originally due to 2 June, but it was delayed to 30 June and then 14 July without any previous announcement from the band.

Singles
The Chainsmokers and Coldplay collaborated on the first single "Something Just Like This", which was released on 22 February 2017.  For the EP, a previously unreleased version, titled "Tokyo Remix" was recorded live in Tokyo, Japan in April and released on June 23. The full extended play was released on the same day as the second single "Miracles (Someone Special)" on 14 July 2017.

Promotional singles
On 22 February 2017, Spotify prematurely posted a banner ad at the top of the site’s home page featuring the graphic of "Something Just like This" with a Listen Now button. The track listing of the album and "Hypnotised" were released on 2 March 2017. "All I Can Think About Is You" was released on 15 June 2017 as the second excerpt from the EP with an accompanying lyric video, which was directed by I Saw John First. 

On 7 July 2017, after the band's performance in Global Citizen Festival Germany, "Aliens" (stylised as "A L I E N S") was released as a charity single. The animated lyric video was directed by Diane Martel and Ben Jones and came out on the same day. All profits earned from it were donated to Migrant Offshore Aid Station, an international non-governmental organisation which rescues refugees.

Critical reception
Upon release, Kaleidoscope received mixed to positive reaction from critics. At Metacritic, which assigns a normalised rating out of 100 to reviews from mainstream critics, the album has an average score of 63 out of 100 based on 8 reviews, which indicates "generally favorable reviews". Reviewing for AllMusic, Stephen Thomas Erlewine comments "Coldplay haven’t entirely been sucked into the machinery while trying to subvert pop music from within", giving the EP three and a half stars. 

Harriet Gibson of The Guardian gave the EP three stars, writing "This EP is nothing but on-brand, however; euphoric emotion, an earnest, universal message and a coating of tacky charm". Mark Beaumont of the NME wrote "Coldplay don’t just churn out anthems. On their surprise-filled new EP, they test the waters and see what floats", and gave the EP four stars. Pitchfork's Jamieson Fox gave the EP 5.8 out of 10, writing "Kaleidoscope isn’t going to kickstart Coldplay’s critical reappraisal, nor does it deserve to. But it rewards those of us who’ve stuck around with a few songs that capture the band at its best". 

Writing for PopMatters, Mike Schiller comments "There’s no story to be told, just a small collection of tunes, some of which work beautifully, some of which fall utterly flat", giving the EP five stars out of ten, and Jon Dolan, reviewing for Rolling Stone wrote "Titled after a soothing interlude from the band's 2015 LP, A Head Full of Dreams, this five-song EP continues that album's mood of tranquil satisfaction" giving it three and a half stars.

Track listing
All tracks are written by Coldplay (Guy Berryman, Jonny Buckland, Will Champion, and Chris Martin) except where noted.

Notes
 "Hypnotised" is 6:31 long on digital releases, but 5:55 on CD and vinyl, same as the promotional single version.
"Miracles (Someone Special)" features Big Sean.
"Something Just Like This" (Tokyo Remix) features The Chainsmokers.

Personnel
Coldplay
 Chris Martin – lead vocals, piano, keyboard, acoustic guitar on "Miracles (Someone Special)", "Aliens" and "Hypnotised"
 Jonny Buckland – guitars
 Guy Berryman – bass, keyboards
 Will Champion – drums, percussion, keyboards, electronic drums, backing vocals
Additional musicians
 Big Sean - rapping (on "Miracles (Someone Special)")
 Brian Eno - additional guitar, and vocals (on "Aliens")
 The Chainsmokers - additional instruments (on "Something Just Like This")

Charts

Weekly charts

Year-end charts

Notes

 B. As per UK Official Chart Rules the EP was not qualified to chart on the UK Albums Chart.

Certifications

References

External links
 
 
 "All I Can Think About Is You" Official lyric video on YouTube
 

2017 EPs
Coldplay EPs
Parlophone EPs
Albums produced by Rik Simpson
Albums produced by Markus Dravs
Albums produced by Brian Eno
Atlantic Records EPs